Pierre Repp (5 November 1909 in Saint-Pol-sur-Ternoise, France – 1 November 1986 in Plessis-Trévise, France) was a French humorist and actor. His real name was Pierre Alphonse Léon Frédéric Bouclet. On 14 August 1930, he married Ferdinande Alice Andrée Bouclet in Lille.

He is famous in France for his unique comic talent. He used to simulate stuttering while talking, in a humoristic way, trying to pronounce some words and finally replacing them by others. In a famous French sketch, "Les crêpes", he explained the recipe that way, with sentences like this one: "Then you add some mamerlade, oh sorry ! Some marlamade... Uh! Me, I pour some chocolate".

Pierre Repp appeared in many theatre plays and TV shows, but mainly in music-hall and cabarets in Paris or on tour. Pierre Repp has his place in the French cinéma story due to many "third-roles" in about forty films.

Filmography 

 Une Femme au volant (1933, directed by Kurt Gerron and Pierre Billon)
 La merveilleuse tragédie de Lourdes (1933, directed by Henri Fabert)
 M'sieur la Caille (1955, directed by André Pergament) - The marquis
 Bonjour sourire (1956, directed by Claude Sautet)
 Women's Club (Club of Women) (1956, directed by Ralph Habib) - The usher
 Le colonel est de la revue (1957, directed by Maurice Labro)
 Printemps à Paris (1957, directed by Jean-Claude Roy)
 Nuit blanche et rouge à lèvres (1957, directed by Robert Vernay) - Prince Yucca's secretary
 Brigade des mœurs (1959, directed by Maurice Boutel)
 Les quatre cents coups (The 400 Blows) (1959, directed by François Truffaut) - The English teacher
 Les jeux de l'amour (The Games of Love) (1960, directed by Philippe de Broca) - The car driver
 Crésus  (Croesus) (1960, directed by Jean Giono) - The bank clerk
 Candide ou l'optimisme au XXe siècle (1960, directed by Norbert Carbonnaux) - Le pasteur (uncredited)
 Le bouclier (1960, Short film about security, directed by Georges Rouquier) - L'ouvrier bègue
 L'amant de cinq jours (Five Day Lover) (1961, directed by Philippe de Broca) - Pépère
 Le Tracassin ou les plaisirs de la ville (The Busybody) (1961, directed by Alex Joffé) - The strawberries taster
 Cartouche (Swords of Blood) (1962, directed by Philippe de Broca) - Marquis de Griffe
  (Hitch-Hike) (1962, directed by Jacqueline Audry) - The sex maniac
 Un clair de lune à Maubeuge (Moonlight in Maubeuge) (1962, directed by Jean Chérasse) - Le secrétaire bègue
 Césarin joue les étroits mousquetaires (1962, directed by Émile Couzinet) - Césarin
 Un roi sans divertissement (A King Without Distraction) (1963, directed by  François Leterrier) - Ravanel
 La bande à Bobo (1963, directed by Tony Saytor) - Spiguy
 Humour noir (Black Humor) (1965, directed by Claude Autant-Lara) (segment 1 'La Bestiole')
 Fifi la plume (1965, directed by Albert Lamorisse) - Le commissaire
 L'Or du duc (1965, directed by Jacques Baratier and Bernard Toublanc-Michel) - The textile saler
 Le tatoué (The Tattooed One) (1968, directed by Denys de La Patellière) - Countryman with beef (uncredited)
 Sous le signe de Monte-Cristo (The Return of Monte Cristo) (1968, directed by André Hunebelle) - Jauffrey
 Peau d'Âne (Donkey Skin) (1970, directed by Jacques Demy) - Thibaud
 L'explosion (The Hideout) (1971, directed by Marc Simenon - 1971) - Dubois
 La Grande mafia (La Grande Maffia) (1971, directed by Philippe Clair) - The Prime Minister
 Je sais rien, mais je dirai tout (Don't Know Anything But I'll Tell All) (1973, directed by Pierre Richard) - Bernier, le sous-directeur
 Cours après moi que je t'attrape (Run After Me Until I Catch You) (1976, directed by Robert Pouret) - The taxi driver
 Le Gendarme et les extra-terrestres (The Gendarme and the Creatures from Outer Space) (1979, directed by Jean Girault) - The garage mechanic
 Les Givrés (1979, directed by Alain Jaspard) - The ski lift clerk
 Charles et Lucie (1979, directed by Nelly Kaplan) - The bus driver
 Le Gendarme et les gendarmettes (Never Play Clever Again) (1982, directed by Jean Girault) - The stuttering complainant
 Prends ton passe-montagne, on va à la plage (1983, directed by Eddy Matalon) - Le client du garage
 Le téléphone sonne toujours deux fois!! (The Telephone Always Rings Twice) (1985, directed by Jean-Pierre Vergne) - A witness (final film role)

External links

1909 births
1986 deaths
French comedians
French male stage actors
French male television actors
20th-century French male actors
French male film actors
20th-century French comedians